Guatteria williamsii is a species of plant in the Annonaceae family. It is endemic to Venezuela.

References

 World Conservation Monitoring Centre 1998.  Guatteria williamsii.   2006 IUCN Red List of Threatened Species.   Downloaded on 21 August 2007.

williamsii
Endemic flora of Venezuela
Near threatened plants
Near threatened biota of South America
Taxonomy articles created by Polbot